A palatine (palatine guard) was a high-level official attached to imperial or royal courts in Europe since Roman times.

Palatine may also (or more specifically) refer to:

Personal titles
Palatine (Kingdom of Hungary), vice-regent of Hungary
Count palatine, vice-regal office-bearers in Germany
Voivode or Count palatine, a governor in Poland
The holder of a county palatine, northern counties/duchies in England

Places
Palatine, County Carlow, a hamlet in County Carlow, Republic of Ireland
Palatine Hill, the most central hill of the seven hills of Rome
Palatine Township, Illinois, near Chicago, Illinois; one of six townships that form the panhandle of Cook County
Palatine, Illinois, a village predominantly in Palatine Township, near Chicago, Illinois
Palatine, New York, a town in central New York State
Palatine Bridge, New York, a village inside this town in New York

People
Palatines, people from the Palatinates of the Holy Roman Empire
 Guy Palatin (born 2000), Israeli basketball player

Biology
Palatine bone, a bone in the palate
The palatine tonsils in the back of the throat

Entertainment and media
Palatine, a four-CD compilation of Factory Records artists
Palantine, the fictional political candidate with whom Travis Bickle tries to build a relationship with, in Taxi Driver (1976)
Palatine, an elite caste of Xenomorphs from the Alien series

Transportation
The Palatine, a 1938 London train
Northern Counties Palatine, a step-entrance double-decker bus

Other uses
Palatine GAA club, a Gaelic Football club in County Carlow

See also
Electoral Palatinate
Palatinate (disambiguation)
Palatino (disambiguation)
Paladin (disambiguation)
Rhineland-Palatinate, one of the States of the Federal Republic of Germany
Palatinus (Roman Catholic Church), certain high officials of the papal court